is a Japanese manga series written by Hajime Asano and illustrated by NEET. The story revolves around Kinjirō Sakamachi, a 17-year-old high school boy who suffers from gynophobia, the abnormal fear of women. While using the men's washroom, he accidentally discovers that the popular and handsome butler Subaru Konoe is in fact a girl. Now that Kinjirō knows about Subaru's secret, he must work together with Subaru and her sadistic mistress, Kanade Suzutsuki, to protect Subaru's secret from being discovered. 

The manga adaptation began its began its serialization on July 27, 2010 in the Media Factory's seinen manga magazine, Comic Alive. The series was collected into seven manga volumes, published under the Alive Comics imprint. On February 29, 2012, it was announced that the manga series would be licensed in English by Seven Seas Entertainment. A total of seven volumes were released from December 11, 2012, to September 2, 2014. Volume 3 of the English adaptation of Mayo Chiki! reached No. 3 on the New York Times Best Seller List for manga for the week of July 13–20, 2013, while volume 7 reached No. 3 for the week of September 21–28, 2014. The series has also been licensed in Taiwan and released through Sharp Point Press. 

A spin-off manga of the series titled  was serialized in Kadokawa Shoten's bishōjo magazine, Nyantype.

Note: Chapter titles are taken from the English translated manga adaptation by Seven Seas.



Volume list

References

External links
Official manga website 
Mayo Chiki! manga at Seven Seas Entertainment
 

Mayo Chiki!